The Diamond Ranch Academy is a therapeutic boarding school just outside the town of Hurricane, Utah. It admits adolescents with various issues, including anger management issues and major depressive disorder, It enrolls young people between 12 and 18 years of age.
Diamond Ranch Academy was founded in Idaho falls in 1999 by Rob Dias and later moved to southern Utah, where it occupied a  ranch. Enrollees aged 12 to 17 were housed in age- and gender-specific groups on four separate areas of the ranch. Students who had reached the age of 18 before completing the program were housed in a fifth area.

The academy's motto is "Healing Families, One Youth at a Time."  Its education programs are accredited by the Northwest Accreditation Commission, The Joint Commission, and its courses generally last between ten and twelve months.  Activities include various sports, including interscholastic competition, as well as caring for farm animals.

In December 2022 a 17 year-old girl, Taylor Goodridge, collapsed and died while attending the school, which resulted in media attention and allegations of malpractice. The family said in a statement they believed the cause of death to be a heart attack caused by sepsis. In February 2023 Sky News published an article discussing Goodridge's death, in which it included claims by a previous client who alleged that she had suffered partial facial paralysis after being restrained by staff on the campus.

In response to the death of Goodridge, state regulating agencies forbade Diamond Ranch from accepting new students.

History 
When Diamond Ranch Academy first opened in 1999, it was a working ranch in Idaho- students were expected to take part in a cattle drive. During initial arrival at Diamond Ranch Academy there was no education for between two to six weeks as students would take part in a wilderness component to the program afterwards the student would receive "continuing education packets" that had been developed by Brigham young University

Notable staff 

 Chad Ryan Huntsman

Former headteachers 

 Cory Henwood
 Bo Iverson

Oversight 

 State of Utah Department of Human Services
 National Association of Therapeutic Schools and Programs
 Joint Commission

References

External links
Official site
Diamond Ranch Academy blog
Diamond Ranch Academy Reviews

Private high schools in Utah
Private middle schools in Utah
Therapeutic boarding schools in the United States
Educational institutions established in 1999
Schools in Washington County, Utah
1999 establishments in Idaho
Behavior modification
All pages needing cleanup
Schools needing cleanup